Pigment Yellow 10 is an organic compound that is classified as a Monoazopyrazolone pigment.  It is used as a yellow colorant, notably as yellow road marking on highways in the US.  The compound is synthesized by coupling the diazonium salt derived from dichloroaniline with the pyrazolone.

The structure of the dye, as determined by X-ray crystallography, consists of planar molecule with a C=O bond and two hydrazone groups.

References

Pigments
Organic pigments
Shades of yellow
Azo dyes